Joshua Umaru Anaja was the military governor of Plateau State, Nigeria from July 1978 to October 1979 during the military regime of General Olusegun Obasanjo.
On 1 October 1979, he handed over to the elected civilian governor Solomon Lar, who assured him that his government would inherit any realistic obligations made by the out-going military government.
Promoted to Brigadier, Anaja was Director of the Department of Joint Studies at the Armed Forces Command and Staff College, Jaji from 1 February 1984 to 25 May 1985.
Anaja died in mysterious circumstances.

References

Governors of Plateau State
Nigerian Army officers
Instructors at the Nigerian Armed Forces Command and Staff College
1986 deaths